Doryssa hohenackeri is a species of freshwater snail with an operculum, an aquatic gastropod mollusk in the family Pachychilidae.

Distribution 
This species occurs in the South America:
 Venezuela
 Guyana
 Puerto Rico
 Suriname

References

hohenackeri
Gastropods described in 1851
Molluscs of Venezuela
Invertebrates of Guyana
Fauna of Suriname
Fauna of Puerto Rico